Bähr (transliterated Baehr) is a German surname. Notable people with the surname include:

 Barbara Baehr (born Hoffmann, 1953), German research scientist, entomologist, arachnologist, and spider taxonomist
 Bettina Bähr-Losse (born 1967), German lawyer and politician
 Eduardo Bähr (born 1940), Honduran writer and actor
 Ferdinand Baehr (1822–1892), American politician
 George Bähr (1666–1738), German architect
 Herman C. Baehr (1866–1942), American politician
 Johann Bähr (1655–1700), Austrian author, court official and composer
 Johann Christian Felix Baehr (1798–1872), German philologist
 Johann Karl Bähr (1801–1869), German painter and writer
 Klaus-Dieter Bähr (born 1941), German rower
 Ludwig Baehr, German officer, diplomat and artist
 Markus Bähr (born 1974), German former professional footballer
 Martin Baehr (1943–2019), German entomologist
 Mathias Bähr (born 1960), German neurologist
 Otto Bähr (1817–1895), German legal scholar
 Pierre Baehr (born 1954), French former backstroke swimmer
 Robert Allen (actor) (born Irvine E. Theodore Baehr, 1906–1998), American actor
 Ted Baehr (born 1946), American media critic
 Tom Baehr-Jones (born 1980), American physicist
 Ulrich Baehr, German astronomer, eponym for the asteroid 26821 Baehr

See also 
 Bahr (surname)
 Baire
 Bär, Baer
 Baehr v. Miike
 Behr

German-language surnames
Jewish surnames
Surnames from nicknames